Lepidochrysops quassi, the tailed blue giant Cupid, is a butterfly in the family Lycaenidae. It is found in Ivory Coast, Ghana, Togo, Nigeria and Cameroon. Its habitat consists of open areas in the forest zone.

Adults have been recorded on wing in August and September and from June to November.

The larvae feed on Solenostemon ocymoides and probably also on Ocimum species. They are associated with the ant species Camponotus maculatus.

Subspecies
 Lepidochrysops quassi quassi – Ivory Coast, Ghana, Togo, southern Nigeria
 Lepidochrysops quassi bernaudi Libert & Collins, 2001 – Cameroon

References

Butterflies described in 1895
Lepidochrysops
Butterflies of Africa